Belvedere Football Club is an Irish association football club based in Fairview/Clontarf, Dublin. Belvedere currently fields teams in the Dublin & District Schoolboy League. The club has also entered teams in the FAI Youth Cup, the FAI Under-17 Cup, the Milk Cup and the Umbro Galway Cup.  Like Home Farm, Stella Maris and Cherry Orchard, Belvedere is well known for its youth system which has successfully produced hundreds of players who have gone onto play & coach for professional clubs throughout Ireland, the United Kingdom and worldwide. In addition hundreds have also gone on to represent the Republic of Ireland at various international levels & to date the club have 15 full internationals.

History
Belvedere Football Club was founded in 1971 in North Inner City Dublin. It was originally the football section of Belvedere Youth Club which had been formed in 1918. The club first began to field teams in the Dublin & District Schoolboy League in 1971–72. In the seasons since the club has won an astonishing array of youth league and cup competitions at both provincial and national level. The club first came to national prominence in 1987–88 when they won the FAI Under-17 Cup. In February 1990 the club played a small part in launching the career of Roy Keane. Belvedere played a Cobh Ramblers team featuring Keane in an FAI Youth Cup game at Fairview Park. Former Belvedere manager and Nottingham Forest scout, Noel McCabe subsequently recommended Keane to Brian Clough. In 1990–91 Belvedere won the FAI Youth Cup for the first time and within a few seasons Mark Kennedy and then Curtis Fleming became the first two former Belvedere players to represent the Republic of Ireland at full international level. Initially Belvedere recruited players from its home base in Northside, Dublin. However as the clubs reputation grew, it also began to recruit from throughout the Greater Dublin Area and then nationally throughout Ireland. Players from outside Dublin were known as "Belvo culchies" and included, among others, David Forde. 

In 2004 Belvedere were runners-up in the prestigious Milk Cup, losing 3–1 to Heart of Midlothian in the final. In 2009 they also won the Umbro Galway Cup. During this era they were also regular winners of the FAI Under-17 Cup.

On 31 May 2015 during an away game against St Kevin's Boys, Shetemi Ayetigbo, a Nigerian-Irish footballer then aged 16, collapsed and died while playing for Belvedere.

Notable former players

Players
Republic of Ireland internationals
{|
|- style="vertical-align:top"
||
  Thomas Butler
  Stephen Elliott
  Curtis Fleming
  David Forde
  Wes Hoolahan
 Darragh Lenihan
||
  Stephen Kelly 
  Troy Parrott
  Mark Kennedy
  Richard Sadlier
  Cillian Sheridan
  Keith Treacy
  Matt Doherty
  Graham Burke
  Roberto Lopes
  Leovan O'Garro
League of Ireland XI representatives
  John McDonnell
  Conor Powell
  Richie Ryan
  Derek Swan
Republic of Ireland B internationals
  Richie Byrne
  Tony Cousins
  Martin Russell
Republic of Ireland U23 international
  Ross Gaynor
  Mark Quigley
  Ger Rowe
Republic of Ireland U21 internationals

Republic of Ireland U19 internationals
  Neill Byrne
  Tim Clancy
  Jimmy Keohane
  Adrian Harper
  Ricky McEvoy
Republic of Ireland U18 internationals

Republic of Ireland U17 internationals
  Philip Byrne
  Wesley Byrne
  Colin Cassidy
  Alan Cawley
  Paul Corry

Republic of Ireland U16 internationals
  Kevin Grogan
  Sean Hayden
  Anthony Dodd

Managers

Honours
FAI Youth Cup
Winners: 1990–91, 1998–99, 2004–05: 3
FAI Under-17 Cup
Winners: 1987–88, 1989–90, 1999–2000, 2004–05, 2006–07, 2008–09, 2009–10, 2010–11: 8
Milk Cup
Runners-up: 2004: 1
Galway Cup
Winners: 2009: 1

References

   
Association football clubs established in 1971
1971 establishments in Ireland
Association football clubs in Dublin (city)
Association football academies in the Republic of Ireland